KYCS (95.1 FM) is a hot adult contemporary station broadcasting from Rock Springs, Wyoming.

The station signed on in 1986, as the first sister station of KUGR, which had been broadcasting for ten years at the time. Like its sister stations, the station is currently owned by Wagonwheel Communications Corporation.

Music on KYCS is primarily satellite fed, which is also true to its sister stations besides KUGR. The network, known as Today's Best Hits, hosts numerous DJs throughout the day, including a morning show. The network is part of Cumulus Media, formerly ABC Radio Networks.

KYCS celebrated its twenty first year of broadcasting in 2007.

Signal
Like its sister stations, KYCS broadcasts from a tower located on Wilkins Peak, which is just outside Rock Springs. The 11,500 watt signal reaches into parts of northern Utah to the south. To the west, the station reaches Evanston before fading out completely. To the east, Rawlins receives fringe coverage. KYCS can be heard as far north as the Wind River mountain range.

References

External links

YCS
Radio stations established in 1986
Hot adult contemporary radio stations in the United States
Sweetwater County, Wyoming
1986 establishments in Wyoming